Vasile Sebastian Dîncu (born 25 November 1961) is a Romanian politician, sociologist, professor and writer who served as Deputy Prime Minister in the Cioloș Cabinet and was Minister of National Defence in the Ciucă Cabinet.

Biography
Vasile Dîncu was born on 25 November 1961 in Năsăud, a town now in Bistrița-Năsăud County. Dîncu is a member of the Social Democratic Party (PSD) since 2019, having previously been part of the party from 2000 to 2008. She has also been a Member of the European Parliament, of the Party of European Socialists (PES) and a Senator of Romania.

Between 2015 and 2017, Dîncu served as Deputy Prime Minister and Minister of Regional Development and Public Administration in the cabinet of former Prime Minister of Romania Dacian Cioloș. He then retired from politics for a while, but later returned and, on 2020, he was elected once again as a member of the Senate of Romania for PSD. On 25 November 2021, Dîncu was appointed as Minister of National Defence in the Ciucă Cabinet, succeeding Nicolae Ciucă in his post as the latter became the new Prime Minister of Romania. On 24 October 2022 Dîncu resigned as Minister of National Defence following comments he made on social media recommending the US and NATO should negotiate with Russia on behalf of Ukraine. He cited an inability to collaborate with the President as his reason for resigning.  

Dîncu has published several books. He is a member of the Writers' Union of Romania.

References

External links
 European Parliament profile
 European Parliament official photo
 Senate of Romania - Vasile Dîncu 2020

1961 births
Living people
People from Năsăud
Social Democratic Party (Romania) politicians
Social Democratic Party (Romania) MEPs
MEPs for Romania 2007
Romanian Ministers of Defence
Babeș-Bolyai University alumni
Academic staff of the University of Bucharest
Romanian sociologists
Romanian writers